Unfinished Business is a 2015 American comedy film directed by Ken Scott and written by Steven Conrad. The film stars Vince Vaughn, Tom Wilkinson, Dave Franco, Sienna Miller, Nick Frost, and James Marsden. It was released on March 6, 2015. The film was panned by critics and was a box office bomb, only grossing $14.4 million on a budget of $35 million.

Plot

After arguing with his boss Chuck Portnoy of Dynamic Systems, Dan Trunkman decides to start his own business in the metal swarf-selling field. Tim McWinters, who was fired for being too old, and Mike Pancake, who was there for an interview, follow Dan and join his new company. A year later, Dan's business, Apex Select, has barely gotten off the ground. In a Dunkin' Donuts, Dan gets a message to go on a business trip to Portland to meet with investors Jim Spinch and Bill Whilmsley, the latter being a friend of Dan's.

Dan's children Paul and Bess are being bullied at school. Paul is ridiculed for his weight and attempts to wear eye shadow to fit in with the goth kids. Bess asks Dan to finish a homework assignment of hers that requires him to describe the kind of person he is. Dan's wife, Susan wants to put Paul in a private school, despite the expensive tuition, to bring him out of his shell.

The three head to Portland, only for Dan to discover that Chuck is there trying to close a deal as well. She and Jim get along well, having worked together before, and it appears as though she's been given the go ahead. Dan gives his presentation to Jim, only to faint in the middle of it. He makes Mike go finish, but everyone is distracted by Mike's last name. This forces Dan to scramble and find a way to get a step ahead of Chuck. Dan starts to lose faith in the team, as Tim is more concerned about finding a woman to make love with due to an unhappy marriage, and Mike never attended college while possibly being autistic.

Dan is told to go to Berlin to meet with Jim's parent department Gelger, specifically with Dirk Austerlitz. Dan travels with Tim and Mike and they go to find a client, Helen Harlmann, at a unisex sauna. He finds Helen with three other people. She doesn't trust him since he walked in there fully dressed in a suit. Dan undresses himself and gets Helen to listen to him, with Mike and Tim joining him despite him telling them not to.

Dan speaks to Bess, who had trouble at school, but he is unaware as to why and offers her heartfelt advice only to hang up and see Susan's emailed link which is to a video of Bess beating a kid up.

Mike finds a hotel for Tim and himself to stay at. Dan is in a room that is actually an exhibit called "American Businessman 42" in a museum, where everyone watches him. He starts to put some numbers together to outdo Chuck. Tim procures ecstasy from one of the youths staying at the hotel. Tim and Mike follow him to find Bill in a gay nightclub during Folsom Europe Festival. Dan encounters Bill in a room with other men sticking their penises through glory holes. Bill later explains this is the only way he can get any sort of pleasure. He takes a look at Dan's numbers and says they definitely trounce Chuck's numbers. Dan and Bill also speak about how easy it is to get derailed from course.

The guys meet with Jim only to learn that Dirk Austerlitz is in St. Louis (the guys' hometown), annoying Dan. Jim later tells Dan that while his numbers are good, they aren't good enough to close the deal. The trio spends time with some of the youth at the hotel, being honest and smoking. After not smoking but listening to everyone, especially Mike, Dan goes out to buy "Straight Up Teal" eyeshadow and speak with his wife, his daughter, who reveals she beat up the other child for calling Paul names like "double stuff". Dan congratulates her but explains he will take care of Paul. He speaks with Paul and does his best to pick his spirits up. Dan later finds himself depressed and drinking with strangers/admirers of "American Businessman 42".

Dan awakes the next morning hungover. Feeling a sense of inspiration, he joins a marathon and ignores an official's pleas for him to leave the race. Some of his "American Businessman 42" fans spot him and begin cheering him on with such enthusiasm it attracts the attention of a news caster. He finishes the race, poignant as he had trained for the St. Louis  marathon.

Dan later manages to score a meeting with Dirk, via Bill. First, the guys pass through a riot going on outside the building where Austerlitz is located. After evading police and getting pelted with paintballs, the guys make it inside with the aid of Bill. Austerlitz likes what he hears from Dan, then what he sees on their front page, and they close a deal, thereby saving Dan's business. He, Tim, and Mike celebrate by gloating in front of both Chuck and Jim.

The guys return home to their respective loved ones. Mike rejoins his friends from the special home and boasts his multiple "explers" in Berlin. Tim reunites with the maid he encountered in Portland. Dan rejoins his family, now confident of their future.

Cast
 Vince Vaughn as Daniel "Dan" Trunkman
 Tom Wilkinson as Timothy McWinters
 Dave Franco as Mike Pancake
 Sienna Miller as Charlene "Chuck" Portnoy
 June Diane Raphael as Susan Trunkman
 Ella Anderson as Bess Trunkman
 Britton Sear as Paul Trunkman
 James Marsden as Jim Spinch
 Nick Frost as Bill Whilmsley
 Uwe Ochsenknecht as Maarten Daaervk
 Michael Tow as Japanese Business Man

Production
Filming began in mid-November 2013, in Boston, Massachusetts. In early October 2014, Vaughn and Miller were back in Boston for re-shoots of the film, and both actors were photographed on the set.

Marketing
On November 26, 2014, 20th Century Fox released two trailers of the film. A restricted trailer and an edited trailer. The edited trailer was attached to screenings of Taken 3 and Mortdecai. On February 1, 2015, an advertisement for the film was released during Super Bowl XLIX that showed a montage of scenes set to the song "Like a Boss".

Reception

Box office
Unfinished Business was a box office bomb. The film grossed $10.2 million in North America and $4.2 million in other territories for a total gross of $14.4 million, failing to make back its budget of $35 million.

In its opening weekend, Unfinished Business grossed $4.8 million, finishing in 10th place at the box office. This was the lowest opening of Vince Vaughn's career, the previous unfortunate box office low being $7 million by 2013's Delivery Man.

Critical response
Unfinished Business has received mostly negative reviews. On Rotten Tomatoes the film has an approval rating of 10%, based on 100 reviews, with a rating average of 3.48/10. The site's critical consensus reads, "Unfocused and unfunny, Unfinished Business lives down to its title with a slipshod screenplay and poorly directed performances that would have been better left unreleased." On Metacritic the film has a weighted average score of 32 out of 100, based on reviews from 26 critics, indicating "generally unfavorable reviews". Audiences polled by CinemaScore gave the film a grade of "B−" on an A+ to F scale.

Justin Chang of Variety called it "A comedy with its heart in the right place and everything else bizarrely out of joint." James Berardinelli of ReelViews was critical of the film: "Unfinished Business is bad – not epically bad but bad enough. Little contained in this misfire of a film works and the few successful things are dragged out to the point where they die a lingering death". Joe Neumaier of the New York Daily News wrote: "Unfinished Business squanders almost every opportunity provided by its potentially funny premise. Instead, it becomes yet another blotch on star Vince Vaughn's résumé." Robbie Collin of The Daily Telegraph gave the film 1 star out of 5, and said "Mawkishness, gay panic, and lazy jokes make Vince Vaughn's workplace comedy considerably less fun than work itself."

Brad Wheeler of the Toronto Globe and Mail wrote: "Not without charm, Unfinished Business mixes the cute with the raunchy." Michael O'Sullivan of The Washington Post wrote: "While by no means a masterpiece, the comedy, by Canadian director Ken Scott, is a careful calibration of crass gags and genuine sentiment that succeeds more often than it fails."

References

External links
 

2015 films
2015 comedy films
2010s buddy comedy films
20th Century Fox films
American buddy comedy films
Babelsberg Studio films
Escape Artists films
Films directed by Ken Scott
Films scored by Alex Wurman
Films set in Berlin
Films shot in Berlin
Films shot in Germany
Films shot in Massachusetts
Midlife crisis films
Regency Enterprises films
2010s English-language films
Films produced by Arnon Milchan
2010s American films